Durostorum Bay (‘Zaliv Durostorum’ \'za-liv du-ro-'sto-rum\) is the 6.7 km wide bay indenting for 3.9 km Oscar II Coast in Graham Land southeast of Sandilh Point and northwest of Ranyari Point.  It is part of Exasperation Inlet, formed as a result of the break-up of Larsen Ice Shelf in the area and the retreat of Pequod Glacier in the early 21st century.  Named after the ancient town of Durostorum in Northeastern Bulgaria.

Location
SCAR Antarctic Digital Database mapping in 2012.

Maps
Antarctic Digital Database (ADD). Scale 1:250000 topographic map of Antarctica. Scientific Committee on Antarctic Research (SCAR). Since 1993, regularly upgraded and updated.

References
 Durostorum Bay. SCAR Composite Antarctic Gazetteer.
 Bulgarian Antarctic Gazetteer. Antarctic Place-names Commission. (details in Bulgarian, basic data in English)

External links
 Durostorum Bay. Copernix satellite image

Bays of Graham Land
Oscar II Coast
Bulgaria and the Antarctic